Roger Pierce may refer to:

 Roger D. Pierce (born 1951), United States diplomat
 Roger Pierce (cricketer) (born 1952), New Zealand cricketer